Byurakn is a village in the Amasia Municipality of the Shirak Province of Armenia near the Armenia–Turkey border. The Statistical Committee of Armenia reported its population was 926 in 2010, up from 781 at the 2001 census.

Demographics 
According to the 1912 publication of Kavkazskiy kalendar, there was a mainly Karapapakh population of 1,046 people in the village of Gyullibulakh of the Kars Okrug of the Kars Oblast.

The population of the village since 1886 is as follows:

References 

Communities in Shirak Province
Populated places in Shirak Province